The men's sprint (3650 meters) event at the 2011 Asian Winter Games was held on 31 January at the Almaty Biathlon and Cross-Country Ski Complex.

Schedule
All times are Almaty Time (UTC+06:00)

Results
Legend
DSQ — Disqualified

References

External links
Official Website

Men's sprint